The following are international rankings of Brazil.

Economy

 International Monetary Fund: GDP (nominal) 2012, ranked 7 out of 181 countries
 International Monetary Fund: GDP (nominal) per capita 2011, ranked 53 out of 183 countries
 The Wall Street Journal and the Heritage Foundation: Index of Economic Freedom 2006, ranked 81 out of 157 countries
 World Economic Forum: Global Competitiveness Index 2011-2012, ranked 53 out of 142 countries 
 Motor Vehicle Production (OICA): ranked 6

Environment

 Yale University and Columbia University: 2012 Environmental Performance Index, ranked 30 out of 132

Globalization

2010 KOF Index of Globalization ranked 75 out of 181

Military

Institute for Economics and Peace  Global Peace Index ranked 85 out of 144

Politics

 Transparency International: 2011 Corruption Perceptions Index, ranked 73 out of 182 countries
 Reporters Without Borders: 2011-2012 Press Freedom Index, ranked 99 out of 179 countries

Technology 
 Economist Intelligence Unit: E-readiness 2008, ranked 41 out of 70 countries
 Futron: Space Competitiveness Index 2010, ranked 10th in the world

Society 

 United Nations: 2011 Human Development Index, ranked 84 out of 187 countries

References 

Brazil